Valentín Carboni (born 5 March 2005) is an Argentine footballer who plays as an attacking midfielder for Serie A club Inter Milan. Having represented both Italy and Argentina at youth international level, Carboni currently plays for the Argentina under-20 national team.

In September 2022, Carboni was included in The Guardian list of the 60 best talents in the world to be born in 2005.

Club career
Born in Buenos Aires, in his early childhood Carboni played futsal at the grassroots team Club Lafuente in Lanús; in 2013, aged eight, he started playing football by joining the youth academy of Lanús.

In July 2019, Carboni joined the youth sector of Italian side Catania, together with his older brother Franco and his father Ezequiel, who had just taken on a double role as youth coach and head of youth development at the club. One year later, after having attracted the interest of several high-profile European clubs, the midfielder and his brother both joined Serie A club Inter Milan, for an estimated €300.000 transfer fee.

Carboni quickly came through the Nerazzurri's youth ranks, establishing himself as part of the under-19 squad since the start of the 2021–22 season, and helping the aforementioned team win the under-19 national championship in 2022.

At the start of the 2022–23 campaign, while keeping featuring for the Primavera squad in the national league and in the UEFA Youth League, Carboni started training with Inter Milan's first team under head coach Simone Inzaghi. The midfielder subsequently made his professional debut on 1 October 2022, at 17 years and 206 days, coming on as a substitute for Federico Dimarco in the 88th minute of a 2–1 league loss against Roma. Then, on 1 November, he made his UEFA Champions League debut, replacing Joaquín Correa in the 76th minute of a 2–0 group stage loss against Bayern Munich.

International career
Thanks to his dual citizenship, Carboni is eligible to represent both Italy and Argentina at international level.

In 2019, he was involved in several training camps with the Italian under-15 national team; then, he proceeded to play for the Italian under-17 national team between 2021 and 2022.

In March of the latter year, he switched allegiance to Argentina and received his first official call-up to the Argentine senior national team, having been included in the preliminary list for the 2022 FIFA World Cup qualification matches against Venezuela and Ecuador.

In May 2022, he was included by head coach Javier Mascherano in the Argentine under-20 squad that took part in the Maurice Revello Tournament in France, as the Albiceleste eventually finished in fifth place, after winning the play-off match against Japan.

In October 2022, he was included by head coach Lionel Scaloni in Argentina's preliminary squad for the 2022 FIFA World Cup in Qatar, although he did not make the cut to the final 26-men list.

In March 2023, he was called up again to the Argentina senior national team for two friendly matches against Panama and Curaçao.

Style of play 
Carboni is a left-footed attacking midfielder who mainly operates in the number 10 role, but can also play as a centre-forward, an inverted winger on the right side, or a mezzala. An elegant, composed and creative player, he frequently moves between his team's attacking lines, whether he keeps possession with his ball control, finds team-mates via through passes or first-touch combinations, or directly goes for the shot from short or long range.

Despite being mainly regarded for his offensive contributions, thanks to his vision, his individual technique and his dribbling skills, he has proved to be effective in the defensive side of his game, as well, especially because of his work rate.

He named his fellow countryman Lionel Messi as his biggest source of inspiration.

In September 2022, Carboni was included in The Guardian's list of the 60 best talents in the world to be born in 2005.

Personal life
Carboni is the son of former Argentine footballer Ezequiel Carboni.

His older brother Franco (born 2003) is a footballer himself: the two played together in the youth sectors of Lanús, Catania and Inter Milan.

He also has two younger siblings, Cristiano (born 2009) and Alma (born 2016).

Career statistics

Club

Honours 
Inter Under-19

 Campionato Primavera 1: 2021–22
Inter Milan
 Supercoppa Italiana: 2022

References

External links
 Profile at the Inter Milan website
 
 

2005 births
Living people
Footballers from Buenos Aires
Argentine footballers
Argentina youth international footballers
Italian footballers
Italy youth international footballers
Argentine people of Italian descent
Italian people of Argentine descent
Association football midfielders
Serie A players
Club Atlético Lanús footballers
Catania S.S.D. players
Inter Milan players
Argentine expatriate footballers
Expatriate footballers in Italy
Argentine expatriate sportspeople in Italy